Norton Furnace is a ghost town in Bristol County, Massachusetts, United States.

The general area where Norton Furnace was located is today known as Meadowbrook.

History
A furnace for manufacturing iron was established here in 1825 by Annes A. Lincoln, Jr.  By 1837, it employed 25 people.

The early settlement was known as "Norton Furnace", "Copperworks Village", and "Norton Mills".

By 1850, the settlement had 25 houses and a store.

Two companies located there—Norton Copper Works, and the Norton Furnace Company—remained active until the 1890s, after which the Norton Copper Works moved to Worcester and the Norton Furnace Company moved to near Boston.

A branch of the Old Colony Railroad ran through the settlement, and by 1871 a station was located there.

A post office was located there as early as 1899.  The Meadowbrook post office was located there from 1902 to 1912.

See also
List of Old Colony Railroad stations

References

History of Bristol County, Massachusetts
Ghost towns in Massachusetts
Populated places in Bristol County, Massachusetts